Calvaria can refer to any of the following:

 the Latin name of Calvary, the site of Jesus's crucifixion 
 Kalwaria (disambiguation) or Kalvarija (disambiguation), places named after Calvary
 calvaria (skull), a portion of the skull forming the roof of the cranial cavity
 Calvaria, a former scientific generic name of some tropical trees including the tambalacoque tree (Sideroxylon grandiflorum)
 various types of skullcaps, such as the kippah, topi, or zucchetto.

See also
 Calvary (disambiguation)